Primrose Hill is a Grade II listed public park located north of Regent's Park in London, England, first opened to the public in 1842. It was named after the  natural hill in the centre of the park, the second highest natural point in the London Borough of Camden. The hill summit has a clear view of central London, as well as Hampstead and Belsize Park to the north  and is adorned by an engraved quotation from William Blake. Based on the popularity of the park, the surrounding district and electoral ward were named Primrose Hill. The Primrose Hill district is in the London Borough of Camden, England.

Amenities of the park include an outdoor gym known as the Hill Trim Trail, a children's playground, and toilets, all located on the south side near Primrose Hill bridge which connects to London Zoo and Regent's Park.

History

Like the Regent's Park, Primrose Hill was once part of a great chase appropriated by Henry VIII. Later, in 1841, it became Crown property and in 1842 an Act of Parliament secured the land as public open space. The name "Primrose Hill" has been in use since the 15th century, giving the lie to later claims that it was named after Archibald Primrose, whose premiership witnessed the rapid expansion of London underground rail network London.

In October 1678, Primrose Hill was the scene of the mysterious murder of Sir Edmund Berry Godfrey. In 1679 three Catholic labourers, Robert Green, Henry Berry and Lawrence Hill were found guilty of the murder (though subsequently exonerated) and hanged at the top of the hill. For a few years after the hanging, Primrose Hill was known as Greenberry Hill. In 1792 the radical Unitarian poet and antiquarian Iolo Morganwg (Edward Williams) founded the Gorsedd, a community of Welsh bards, at a ceremony on 21 June at Primrose Hill.

The canal through the area was completed in 1816, and the railway, running under the hill, was completed in 1838; this was the first rail tunnel in London. By that time, the area was considered to be a "prime development opportunity" according to one source. In 1840,  Charles FitzRoy, 3rd Baron Southampton, sold the land that he owned and new villas were built over the subsequent years. Other land was still owned by Eton College but transferred to the government in 1841. The Crown drained and leveled the land after 1851 and began adding park features, to turn it into "park for the people". The park was historically split between the ancient parishes (which later became metropolitan boroughs) of Marylebone (now part of the City of Westminster), St Pancras and Hampstead (in the modern London Borough of Camden), with the hill itself a part of Hampstead.

The area east of the park was developed and became known as Primrose Hill, after the park. The Primrose Hill district is surrounded by St John's Wood to the west, Swiss Cottage to the northwest, Belsize Park to the north, Chalk Farm to the northeast, Camden Town to the east and Regent's Park itself lies adjacent to the south of the hill itself. The nearest stations to Primrose Hill are Chalk Farm tube station to the northeast and Swiss Cottage tube station to the northwest. The defunct Primrose Hill railway station, now housing a business, sits on the railway lines that separate the Primrose Hill area from Camden Town. Primrose Hill Tunnel, the first railway tunnel in London, has had its eastern portals Grade II*- and its western portals Grade II* listed since 1974. Beginning in the late 1960s several of the roads were closed to motor traffic in response to an unacceptable level of collisions and consequent loss of life. The changes were carefully designed to render the area largely free of through motor traffic.

Crowds flocked to Primrose Hill following the loosening of lockdown restrictions due to the COVID-19 pandemic in London. Large amounts of litter were left around the park and social distancing was not observed. This resulted in the closure of Primrose Hill temporarily over the weekend.

, the Primrose Hill Open Space is managed by The Royal Parks.

In Culture

Primrose Hill is commonly referred to as an 'iconic', and 'famous' location, and features significantly in popular British culture.

 The band Madness have a song named Primrose Hill on their album The Rise & Fall. 
The song For Tomorrow by Blur references Primrose Hill, and the extended version's title includes ''(Visit to Primrose Hill Extended).
 Bridget Jones: The Edge of Reason was partially filmed on Primrose Hill. 
 Primrose Hill was a key location in Paddington and Paddington 2

During the 1990s Primrose Hill was a popular place to live with some who worked in the film, music and fashion industries and who were referred to as the Primrose Hill set in the media.

Notable buildings and residents

The Primrose Hill district is an archetypal example of a successful London urban village, due to the location and the quality of its socio-historical development, and is home to many prominent residents. There are seven English Heritage blue plaques in Primrose Hill commemorating the historic personalities that have lived there.
The plaques mark the residences of poet Sir Hugh Clough, historian and broadcaster A. J. P. Taylor and painter William Roberts at 11, 13, and 14 St Mark's Crescent respectively; revolutionary socialist and philosopher Friedrich Engels at 122 (and later 41) Regent's Park Road; photographer Roger Fenton at 2 Albert Terrace; poet and novelist Sylvia Plath at 3 Chalcot Square; and poet William Butler Yeats at 23 Fitzroy Road.

Stanley Johnson and Lukas Heller each lived at different times at the 'Rocking Horse House' on Regent's Park Road.
Broadcasters Joan Bakewell and Nicholas Crane and actors Daisy Ridley and Derek Jacobi live in the area.

Elliott Square is a grouping of modernist 1960s houses by Douglas Streeter, built as part of the Chalcot Estate on land owned by Eton College.

See also
 Primrose Hill railway station, by North London Railway

Notes

References

External links

 Primrose Hill – An Urban Village Examined,  by Alistair Barr, Architect & Resident — 
 Article on Primrose Hill Farmers' markets
 Primrose Hill Local Website  — 
 Primrose Hill and Regent's Park in Literature and Music, a bibliography

Hills of London
Parks and open spaces in the London Borough of Camden
Crown Estate
Grade II listed parks and gardens in London
Primrose Hill